Thomas Pigott or Pigot may refer to:

 Thomas Pigott (Bedfordshire MP) (c.1526–1579), MP for Bedfordshire in 1559
 Thomas Pigott (Aylesbury MP), MP for Aylesbury in 1589
 Thomas Pigot  (1657–1686), English priest, linguist, and scientist